Stalking Darkness is a fantasy novel by American writer Lynn Flewelling, the second book in her Nightrunner series. It is preceded by Luck in the Shadows and followed by Traitor's Moon, Shadows Return and The White Road.

References

External links
Lynn Flewelling's Official website
Talk in the Shadows (Lynn Flewelling's livejournal)

1997 American novels
American fantasy novels
Nightrunner series
American LGBT novels